Kent Robert Mackenzie (6 April 1930 – 16 May 1980) was a film director and producer who is mainly remembered for his film The Exiles, which was about Native American young people in Los Angeles. He also was involved with Dimension Films in making educational films such as Can a Parent Be Human?

Biography
Mackenzie was born on April 6, 1930 in Hampstead, England. His mother was English, and his father was Dewitt Mackenzie, who was head of the London Bureau of the Associated Press. After finishing school, Kent Mackenzie enlisted in the air force and later ended up in Hollywood, where, after gaining a scholarship, he made Bunker Hill, his first film. His next film The Exiles was released in 1961.

In later years, he worked as an editor on television documentaries and medical and industrial films and shorts. During the 1960s and 1970s, he taught film-making to high school classes. He also directed some films for Dimension Films.

Since the mid 1970s, he suffered from seizures. He died on 16 May 1980 in Marin County, California as a result of his medication and related complications.

Films

The Exiles
The setting for The Exiles was in Bunker Hill. This was the second time Mackenzie had used the Hill in a film. The first instance was in 1956 when he made a film about the displacement of pensioners being moved because of high-rise buildings being built in their area. The Exiles was an independent film and took three-and-a-half years to make and had its share of issues. During the course of the film some of the cast were imprisoned and therefore never appeared in later scenes. He also lost two of his cameramen. The film is about Native Americans who move from the reservation to the city and some of the issues they encounter. Christina Rose of the Indian Country Today Media Network wrote that it was the first film to give an accurate portrayal of urban natives.

Other films
Before making The Exiles, Mackenzie made Bunker Hill in 1956. He was still a student at USC at the time. The film centered on elderly pensioners and their community and the displacement they experienced because of a block of high-rise offices that was to be built there.

In 1965, he produced and directed The Teenage Revolution, which featured Barry Brown in an early role and was narrated by Van Heflin. It looked at six teenagers and their society and culture as well as their current lives while speculating about their futures.

He directed and produced Saturday Morning, a film about teenagers, released in 1971 through Dimension Films, of which Gary Goldsmith was chief and producer. It was a non-fiction film that involved a group of 20 teenagers being filmed over a period of a week.

Filmography
 Bunker Hill, 1956, director 
 The Exiles, 1961, writer, producer, director, editor 
 Story of a Test Pilot, 1962, editor 
 Story of a Rodeo Cowboy, 1963, producer, director, writer, editor 
 The T.A.M.I. Show, 1964, editor 
 A Skill For Molina, 1964, director, producer 
 The Way Out Men, 1965, editor
 Prelude to War: Beginning of World War II, cinematographer, editor 
 Why Man Creates, editor
 Ivan And His Father, 1970, director
 Saturday Morning, 1971, producer, director, editor
 Sunseed, 1973, editor
 The Searching Years: Can a Parent Be Human?, 1978, director
 The Searching Years: I Owe You Nothing, 1978, director
 Wait until Your Father Gets Home, 1978, director
 Mom, Why Don't You Listen?, 1978, director
 The Searching Years: Mom, Why Won't You Listen?, 1978, director

References

External links
 A Debt Repaid to an Extraordinary Man and Filmmaker: Kent Mackenzie's The Exiles
 

English emigrants to the United States
American film directors
English film directors
American film producers
American film editors
American cinematographers
1930 births
1980 deaths